The 1979 Brownlow Medal was the 52nd year the award was presented to the player adjudged the fairest and best player during the Victorian Football League (VFL) home and away season. Peter Moore of the Collingwood Football Club won the medal by polling twenty-two votes during the 1979 VFL season.

Leading votegetters 
* The player was ineligible to win the medal due to suspension by the AFL Tribunal during the year.

References 

1979 in Australian rules football
1979